Demet Akbağ (née İybar; born 23 December 1959) is a Turkish theatre and film actress.

Biography 
Demet Akbağ was born on 23 December 1959 in Denizli as the third child of Benan and Oktay İybar. Her maternal family is of Turkmen descent. Her paternal family is of Kurdish descent. Her father's religion is Alevism. His family was in Denizli at the time because of the duty of his grandfather as the head of justice department in the city. Her father was a journalist and photographer. She has two elder siblings, Sedef and Kemal. As her parents separated when she was 13, she and her mother and grandmother moved to Istanbul in 1972.

She later enrolled in the Istanbul Girls High School, and as her parents got separated she started attending the Erenköy Girls High School and finished her education there. After finishing high school in 1982, she entered Istanbul Municipal Conservatory and completed school in four years. Her first marriage, when she was 21, lasted four years. She started her professional career first in theatre in the early 1980s and then in television from 1987 onwards. That same year, she was chosen as the TV Star of The Year by Turkey's Association of Magazine Reporters.

Akbağ has been awarded with numerous prizes, including the Golden and Sadri Alisik Best Character Actor for her role in Vizontele, the Afife Jale Best Female Actor for Sen Hiç Ateşböceği Gördün mü?, the Golden Butterfly for Tersine Dünya in 1993, the Ismail Dumbullu (the first actress to get this prize after Suna Pekuysal) in 1995, the Golden Butterfly – Best Comedy Star of The Year in 1996, 1997 and 1998, and the MGD-Comedy Artist Award in both 1996 and 1997. She has also worked with the BKM Actors since their career starts and performed various leading roles in television including Bir Demet Tiyatro and Ölümsüz Aşk, in theatrical plays including Otogargara, Sen Hiç Ateşböceği Gördün mü?, and Bana Bir Şeyler Oluyor, as well as in movies including Where's Firuze?, Eyyvah Eyvah, Eyyvah Eyvah 2, and Eyyvah Eyvah 3. She played in "Kış Uykusu" which won Cannes Award, with Haluk Bilginer for many times.

Filmography

References

External links 
 
 Biyografi.net - Biography of Demet Akbağ 
 Biyografi.info Demet Akbağ

1959 births
Living people
People from Denizli
Turkish stage actresses
Turkish film actresses
Erenköy Girls High School alumni
Turkish people of Kurdish descent
Turkish people of Turkmenistan descent
Best Supporting Actress Golden Orange Award winners
Best Actress Golden Orange Award winners
Golden Butterfly Award winners
20th-century Turkish actresses